Agosti is an Italian surname. Notable people with the surname include:

Antonio Pacheco D'Agosti (born 1976), Uruguayan retired footballer 
Carlos Agostí (born 1922), Spanish-born Mexican film actor
Deborah Agosti (born c. 1952), American Justice of the Supreme Court of Nevada from 1999 to 2005
Ghigo Agosti (born 1936), Italian singer, musician and composer
Guido Agosti (1901–1989), Italian pianist and piano teacher
Livia Leu Agosti (born 1961), the first female ambassador of Switzerland to France and former Swiss Ambassador to Iran
Lucilla Agosti (born 1978), Italian radio and television presenter and actress
Mario Agosti (1904-1992), Italian athlete
Maristella Agosti, Italian full professor at the University of Padua, in the Department of Information Engineering
Orlando Ramón Agosti (1924–1997), Argentine air force general

Given name
Augustin Chaho, an important Romantic Basque writer

Italian-language surnames
Patronymic surnames
Surnames from given names